Balangiga (IPA: [ˌbalaŋˈhɪga]), officially the Municipality of Balangiga, is a 4th class municipality in the province of Eastern Samar, Philippines. According to the 2020 census, it has a population of 14,341 people.

Balangiga is the site of the Balangiga Encounter in 1901, which remains one of the longest-running and most controversial issues of the Philippine–American War.

History

Balangiga Encounter and Bells

During the Philippine-American War, on September 28, 1901, Eugenio Daza, Area Commander of Southeastern Samar and Valeriano Abanador, the Balangiga's pulahan chief, launched an attack on U.S. Army Company C 9th Infantry Regiment who were occupying Balangiga. With Philippine Revolutionary Army forces and Balangiga villagers, killing 48 and wounding 22 of the 78 men of the unit, with only four escaping unhurt and four missing in action. The villagers captured about 100 rifles and 25,000 rounds of ammunition. An estimated 20 to 25 of them died in the fighting, with a similar number of wounded.

In reprisal, General Jacob H. Smith ordered that Samar be turned into a "howling wilderness" and that they shoot any Filipino male above ten years of age who was capable of bearing arms. The American soldiers seized three church bells from the town church and moved them back to the United States as war trophies. The 9th Infantry Regiment maintained that the single bell in their possession was presented to the regiment by villagers when the unit left Balangiga on 9 April 1902. The bell had been actually given to them by the 11th Infantry Regiment, which had taken all three bells when they left Balangiga for Tacloban on 18 October 1901.

Smith and his primary subordinate, Major Littleton Waller of the United States Marine Corps, were both court-martialled for illegal vengeance against the civilian population of Samar. Waller was acquitted of the charges. Smith was found guilty, admonished and retired from service, but charges were dropped shortly after. He was later hailed as a war hero.

The bells were returned on December 11, 2018.

Geography

Balangiga is located on the southern coast of the island of Samar facing Leyte Gulf, and sits at the mouth of the Balangiga River. To the west lies the municipality of Lawaan, to the north is Llorente, and to the east are the municipalities of Quinapondan and Giporlos.

Barangays
Balangiga is politically subdivided into 13 barangays.

 Bacjao
 Cag-olango
 Cansumangcay
 Guinmaayohan
 Poblacion I
 Poblacion II
 Poblacion III
 Poblacion IV
 Poblacion V
 Poblacion VI
 San Miguel
 Santa Rosa
 Maybunga

Climate

Demographics

Economy

Transportation
Balangiga can be reached through public utility vans and buses from Tacloban City. Pedicabs (potpot), tricycles, and habal-habal by the means of inner town transportation.

Education
Balangiga has 9 public elementary schools, namely:

 Balangiga Central Elementary School
 Bacjao Elementary School
 Bangon Elementary School
 Cag-olango Elementary School
 Cansumangkay Elementary School
 Guinmaayohan Elementary School
 Maybunga Elementary School
 San Miguel Elementary School
 Santa Rosa Elementary School

Has 1 public secondary school:

 Southern Samar National Comprehensive High School

Has 1 private secondary school:

 MSH Sisters Academy Balangiga

Daughter Towns
The municipalities of Lawaan, Giporlos, and Quinapondan were former barangays of the municipality of Balangiga.

See also
 Balangiga bells

References

External links

 [ Philippine Standard Geographic Code]
 Philippine Census Information
 Local Governance Performance Management System

Municipalities of Eastern Samar